Too Young to Kiss (also All Too Young) is a 1951 American comedy film from Metro-Goldwyn-Mayer starring Van Johnson and June Allyson.  The film, in which the 34-year-old Allyson's Cynthia Potter masquerades as a 14-year-old child prodigy, was directed by Robert Z. Leonard.

The monaural, black-and-white film clocks in at 91 minutes long.  Despite earning  of its budget, Too Young to Kiss received mixed critical reviews.

Plot
Cynthia Potter is a skilled pianist trying to catch the eye of concert promoter Eric Wainwright.  Wainwright, however, is currently only looking for young talent.  To meet his criteria, Potter (in her 20s), masquerades as her own fictional younger sister, a 14-year-old "Molly" Potter.  Wainwright is captivated by Molly's skills, and as the two work together, Wainwright develops a paternal affectation towards the young performer, while Potter cultivates an incompatible romantic attraction to the promoter.

Credits

Cast
 June Allyson as Cynthia Potter
 Van Johnson as Eric Wainwright
 Gig Young as John Tirsen
 Paula Corday as Denise Dorcet
 Kathryn Givney as Miss Benson
 Larry Keating as Danny Cutler
 Hans Conried as Mr. Sparrow
 Esther Dale as Mrs. Boykin
 Jo Gilbert as Gloria
Source: The New York Times

Crew
 Robert Z. Leonard - film director
 Frances Goodrich - screenwriter
 Albert Hackett - screenwriter
 Sam Zimbalist - film producer
 Frederick de Cordova - film director
 Everett Freeman - story author
 Joseph Ruttenberg - cinematographer
 Conrad A. Nervig - film editor
 Johnny Green - music director
Source: The New York Times

Reception
At the box office, Too Young to Kiss earned US$2.3million on a budget of $1.4M (equivalent to about $M and $M respectively in ).

The Spartanburg Herald-Journal reported that Too Young to Kiss was critically acclaimed.  Hal Erickson described the film as "fluff", and noted that despite retreading 1942's The Major and the Minor, Frances Goodrich and Albert Hackett's scriptwriting kept the material "fresh and funny throughout".  On a four-star scale, Leonard Maltin rated the film at 2.5 stars, calling Allyson's Potter "fetching".  The New York Times Bosley Crowther however, was unimpressed with Allyson and Johnson's adolescent antics and the excessive suspension of disbelief required.

Awards
Five people who worked on Too Young to Kiss were nominated for film awards, with only Allyson winning hers.

Release
Too Young to Kiss premiered in New York on November 22, 1951, and was distributed by Loew's Inc.  In 2015, the film was available on DVD.

References

External links

 
 
 
 

1950s American films
1950s English-language films
1951 films
1951 comedy films
American black-and-white films
American comedy films
films directed by Robert Z. Leonard
films featuring a Best Musical or Comedy Actress Golden Globe winning performance
Metro-Goldwyn-Mayer films